Chuk and Gek is a 1953 Soviet comedy drama film directed by Ivan Lukinsky. It is based on the 1939 story of the same name.

Cast
 Yura Chuchunov as Chuk  
 Andrei Chilikin as Gek  
 Dmitri Pavlov as Father  
 Vera Vasilyeva as Mother 
 Nikolai Komissarov as Watchman  
 Ekaterina Savinova as mail carrier (uncredited)
 Mikhail Troyanovsky as Sleigh Driver

References

Bibliography 
 Rollberg, Peter. Historical Dictionary of Russian and Soviet Cinema. Scarecrow Press, 2008.

External links 
 

1953 films
1953 comedy-drama films
Soviet comedy-drama films
Russian comedy-drama films
1950s Russian-language films
Soviet black-and-white films
Russian black-and-white films